Komagome Dam is a gravity dam located in Aomori Prefecture in Japan. The dam is used for flood control and power production. The catchment area of the dam is 55.9 km2. The dam impounds about 38  ha of land when full and can store 7800 thousand cubic meters of water. The construction of the dam was started on 1982.

References

Dams in Aomori Prefecture
1982 establishments in Japan